Bener is a village in Kuta Panjang district, Gayo Lues Regency in Aceh province, Indonesia. Its population is 577.

Climate
Bener has a cold subtropical highland climate (Cfb) with moderate to heavy rainfall year-round. It is the coldest populated place in Sumatra.

References

Populated places in Aceh